Softball at the 2010 Asian Games was held in Guangzhou, Guangdong, China from November 19 to 26, 2010. Only a women's competition was held. All games were played at the Tianhe Softball Field.

Schedule

Medalists

Squads

Results
All times are China Standard Time (UTC+08:00)

Preliminaries

Final round

Semifinals

Final

Grand final

Final standing

References
Results

External links
Softball Site of 2010 Asian Games

 
2010 in softball
2010
2010 Asian Games events